Sir Keith Roderick Whitson (born 25 March 1943) is a British banker, CEO of HSBC Group until 2003.

He was succeeded by Stephen Green, Baron Green of Hurstpierpoint.

References

1943 births
British bankers
British chief executives
Living people